Shree Ganesh Jewellery House (I) Ltd. (SGJHL) is a Kolkata-based jewellery company founded in 2002. The company is one of the largest manufacturers and exporters of handcrafted gold jewellery in India.

Overview 

The Company was founded by two brothers, Nillesh Parrekh and Umesh Parekh, in 2002. It manufactures handcrafted gold jewellery from its manufacturing units in the Manikanchan (SEZ). The company has formed a joint venture with Italian firm SALP SPA for setting up a 10-tonne lightweight gold jewellery manufacturing base at Domjur West Bengal. The company enters into joint venture with Rocks Creation Limited of Bangladesh for manufacturing of Gold and Diamond Jewellery. The company markets its jewellery products under brand name Gaja. Apart from retail business the company primarily exports its products to the United Arab Emirates (UAE), Singapore and Hong Kong.

The company received the "Four Star Export House" certificate from the Joint Director of Foreign Trade, Government of India in June 2009. The company opened its first branded retail jewellery store at Kolkata and Ahmedabad in October 2007. The company proposed an initial public offer of 14,269,831 equity shares in 2010.  In 2013 the company operated through 46 stores in 34 cities including the existing two large format stores located at Mumbai and Kolkata. It planned to open an additional 20 stores, investing ₹1000 crore. The company is currently quoting at Rs 0.80. There is alleged misappropriation from the company, leaving shareholder high and try. Untrustworthy management.

Awards 

The company received an award for Outstanding Export Performance by the Gems and Jewellery Export Promotion Council (GJEPC). GJEPC duly recognized the perseverance and the performance of the company in 2007 – 2008 and then again in 2008 – 2009. 
Nilesh Parekh was arrested for alleged fraud in the diversion of 1,700 kg of primary gold.

References

External links 
SGJHL Official Website

Jewellery companies of India
Indian jewellers
Jewellery retailers of India
Manufacturing companies based in Kolkata
2002 establishments in West Bengal
Indian companies established in 2002